Argentina has the following types of country subdivisions:

Administrative   divisions 
 Geographical regions of Argentina (6) which are used only traditionally
Provinces (23, provincia)
Autonomous city (1, ciudad autónoma)
Departments / Partidos 376/135
The province of Mendoza divides its territory into departments, which are further divided into districts (distritos), which are called sections (secciones) in the Capital Department.
Municipalities (municipios)
Village, Town, City
Neighbourhoods of Buenos Aires (barrios)
Communes of Buenos Aires (comprise one or more barrios of BsAs.)

See also
 Government of Argentina

References 

 
Lists of subdivisions of Argentina